A junior enterprise is a civil social nonprofit organization established and executed entirely by students of a university or a business school, both at the undergraduate and postgraduate level. The purpose of the organization is to provide services for companies, institutions and society, often in the form of consultancies, while enriching the learning of its members with practical experience in the field of their studies. Often, a junior enterprise is linked to a particular university or business school; by internal regulation, in most of the cases a student must be studying at the specific university in order to actively join the organization. 

The most common expertise areas for junior enterprises are business and management, engineering, marketing, communication, IT services and law. The members of the organization have the chance to take part in real-world projects, while experiencing the functioning of a real company: junior enterprises, indeed, either are real companies, or resemble one in their operational activities, often having a management council and an executive board, together with an own regulation.

The concept

 Non-profit
1.1 Not necessarily by legal status but by nature of activities (in countries, where legal circumstances affect the non-profit legal status)
1.2 Surplus of the JE should not be used for any economic benefits for the members of the JE unless it is for execution of project work. If the legal status allows economic benefits for Management Board, then the National umbrella should ensure that there is a rule in place to prevent this from happening in a JE
 Non-political: not affiliated to political movement or party, however, able to lobby
 Non-religious: not affiliated to a religious movement or church
 Managed entirely by students: only students make and execute strategic decisions.
 Linked to an institution of higher education, but not necessarily affiliated legally. However, support from the University should be proactively sought.
 Legal entity: legal settlement should be proactively sought.
 Fostering entrepreneurship spirit:
7.1 Proactively engaging members in decision making;
7.2 Encouraging them to start their own projects;
7.3 Actively look for new opportunities.
 Contribute to the development of the National Network by providing trainings to the Junior Entrepreneurs about the Network and motivating them to be a part of its activities.
 Fostering members development
9.1 The end result of every project should be the development of members by any mean;
9.2 Every project should develop a soft or a hard skill. The business acquisition, however, if the market allows, should focus on acquiring projects which develop hard skills (e.g.: resource management, analytics, technical, etc.)
9.3 Projects should assume interaction with external parties: private and civil companies
 Aiming at sustainable activity (at least one project a year must be run for clients). Thus, the Junior Enterprise seeks the quality implementation of the Concept.

Goals
This is an opportunity for students to develop self-confidence and experience entrepreneurship at an early stage in their careers, to add practical experience to the theoretical skills and to provide private business with state-of-the-art knowledge from universities.

Due to the particularity of the Junior Enterprise work, the students distinguish themselves for example by their soft skills such as entrepreneurial spirit, team-working, creativity, presentation skills, public speaking, networking and intercultural understanding, work experience, and project management.

History

 1967: Establishment of the first Junior Enterprise in France: Junior ESSEC.
 1969: Establishment of the second Junior Enterprise in Lille, France: EDHEC Junior Etudes.
 1969 : Creation of the French National Confederation.
 1983: Foundation of Junior Entreprise EPFL, the first Junior Entreprise in Switzerland, at the Swiss Federal Institute of Technology in Lausanne (EPFL).
 1987: Foundation of UniPartners - A network of Junior Enterprises in the Netherlands.
 1987: Foundation of the first Junior Enterprise at the LUISS University in Italy, based in Rome
 1988: Foundation of Junior Comtec, the first Junior Enterprise in Germany, based in Darmstadt.
 1988: Foundation of JEME Bocconi, the second Junior Enterprise in Italy, based in Milano. Foundation of the first Junior Enterprises (EJFGV, Poli Junior and UFBAjr) in Brazil.
 1989: Foundation of uniforce Consulting GmbH, the first Junior Enterprise in Austria, based in Vienna.
 1989: Foundation of Junior Consult, the first Junior Enterprise in Denmark, based in Aarhus.
 1989: Foundation of FEA Júnior USP, the first business Junior Enterprise of the University of São Paulo in Brazil.
 1990: Foundation of JUNITEC, the first Junior Enterprise in Portugal, based in Lisbon.
1990: Foundation of Junior Consulting Team e.V., the first Junior Enterprise of Nuremberg, Germany.
 1990: Foundation of EJCM in Brazil, first JE of IT of America.
 1991: Foundation of EAA Consult, the first Junior Enterprise in Belgium, based in Liège.
1991: Foundation of 3E Unicamp, the first JE of University of Campinas, Brazil.
 1992: Foundation of CIJE (later called JE Italy), the Italian Confederation of Junior Enterprises, in order to link the National Confederations. It is based in Milan.
 1992: Foundation of JADE, the European Confederation of Junior Enterprises, in order to link the National Confederations. It is based in Brussels.
 1992: Foundation of Motriz Empresa Junior, the Junior Enterprise of the University of Campinas School of Mechanical Engineering, Brazil.
 1992: Foundation of EESC jr., the Junior Enterprise of the Engineering School of São Carlos, Brasil.
 1993: Foundation of Company Consulting Team (CCT), the first Junior Enterprise of Berlin, Germany.
 1993: Foundation of PUC Júnior, the Junior Enterprise of Pontifícia Universidade Católica of São Paulo, Brasil.
 1995: First Junior Enterprise in the UK - WBC, based at the University of Westminster in London.
 1995: Foundation of Domani Consultoria Internacional, based at the University of Brasília, Brasil.
 1996: CEJE, Spanish Confederation of Junior Enterprises, joins JADE.
 1997: Foundation of ETH juniors - Junior Enterprise of the Swiss Federal Institute of Technology in Zurich, called "ETH Zurich".
 1997: Foundation of Quanta Jr., the Junior Enterprise of the Institute of Physics "Gleb Wataghin" and the Institute of Mathematics, Statistics and Scientific Computing, University of Campinas, Brazil. Quanta Jr. is the first Junior Enterprise of Physics and Math in Latin America.
 1998: Foundation of the first Junior Enterprise in Poland - Junior Consulting Group (presently ConQuest Consulting).
 1998: Foundation of BCJE (later called JADE Belgium), the Belgian Federation of Junior Enterprises, in order to unite the Belgian network.
 2003: Foundation of Brasil Junior, the Brazilian Confederation of Junior Enterprises.
 2004: Foundation of EHL Junior Enterprise - Junior Enterprise of the École hôtelière de Lausanne. First Junior Enterprise worldwide within the hospitality industry.
 2004: JADE gains a new member: JADE Poland
 2005: JADE gains a new member: JADE UK, with WBC acting as a point of contact.
 2007: JADE Switzerland comprises 10 Junior Enterprises (Impact Zurich University of Zurich, JEF University of Fribourg, JEG - JEG University of Geneva, JEHEC University of Lausanne, EHL Junior Enterprise École hôtelière de Lausanne, Junior Entreprise EPFL, Jeune Consulting University of Neuchatel, ESPRIT St. Gallen University of St. Gallen, Brainstart University of Winterthur, ETH Juniors Zürich)
 2008: Foundation of Líder Jr., the Junior Enterprise of the Production Engineering, Universidade Federal de São Carlos, campus Sorocaba, Brasil
 2010: JADE gains a new member: JADE Romania, which comprises 2 Junior Enterprises (Theory and Practice Consult and Business Organization for Students)
 2012: The Tunisian Confederation of Junior Enterprises was created: JET (Junior Enterprises of Tunisia, Foundation of Junior Enterprise Desautels, the first Junior Enterprise in North America, based in Montreal (McGill University), foundation of the first Junior Enterprise in the USA based in The University of Illinois Urbana-Champaign: CUBE Consulting
 2013: Foundation of WAVE Junior Enterprise, the first JE in Mexico based in Mexico City at Instituto Tecnológico Autónomo de México, ITAM http://www.itam.mx/es/index.php
2015: Recognition of JEBrighton by WBC (JADE UK point of contact) as the second Junior Entreprise of the United Kingdom.
2016: Creation of Junior Enterprise USA, the American Confederation of Junior Enterprises.
2016: Creation of the Junior Enterprises Global Council, renamed Junior Enterprises Global in 2018
 2017: Creation of Unovator Junior Enterprise at the Claremont Colleges (Pomona College), California, US.
 2019: JADE is rebranded as JE Europe.

JE Europe
The Junior Enterprise Europe was created in 1992 under the name 'JADE - European Confederation of Junior Enterprises' in order to link all the national confederations of Junior Enterprises in Europe. The founding members were the Netherlands (FNJE), Portugal (JEP), Italy (https://juniorenterprises.it), Switzerland (USJE) and France (CNJE).

Today, the network counts 31.000 student members in fifteen countries, organised in around 280 Junior Enterprises. JE Europe coordinates Junior Initiatives all over Europe and fosters their development. Together with Brasil Junior, the Junior Enterprise Network in Brazil, JE Europe is one of the largest student networks in the world.

As the voice of the Junior Enterprise Movement and youth entrepreneurship in Europe, JE Europe's mission is to:
 Represent the European Junior Enterprise (JE) Movement
 Integrate the European Network of Junior Enterprises thus encouraging knowledge exchange and cooperation
 Support the development of our members (Confederations and Consultative Members)
 Foster the Junior Enterprise Concept to non-member countries
 Encourage entrepreneurship among students in higher Education through the Junior Enterprise Concept.

Based in Brussels, JE Europe works closely with the European Institutions, with international organisations (UNESCO, OECD, World Bank) to promote the importance of entrepreneurship education and youth entrepreneurship in young people, providing a valuable learning-by-doing experience and providing students with the skills they will need to be successful in the labour market.

JE Europe's work and recognitions 
The recognition and acceptance of the Junior Enterprise movement by politicians, public institutions and companies, confirms and proofs the concept of junior entrepreneurship:
 Junior Enterprise is an example of best practice for practical education and development under the Lisbon Strategy: governing strategy of EU in 2000-2010.  "Facilitate the development of Junior Enterprises" is a key priority for Education and Youth Framework of EU2020 –governing strategy of EU in 2010-2020.
 JE Europe is a best practice of an intermediary organisation that brings universities and businesses together under EU Oslo Agenda for Entrepreneurship Education. 
 JE Europe is in the Steering Board of UNESCO Youth Committee for Higher Education.
 JE Europe is a stakeholder consultant for the World Bank, the World Economic Forum and the EU.

Impact on employment and entrepreneurship

Facts and Figures
Diverse studies carried out by JE Europe, the European Commission and other parties, prove that participation in a Junior Enterprisedramatically improves a student's career perspectives, employment and intentions towards entrepreneurship. 
 More than 60% of students who were part of a Junior Enterprise find a job before ending their studies.
 Former Junior Entrepreneurs have significantly better career start after university and continue to develop more successfully in the long-term than their peers' average without JE experience. 
 21% of the Junior Entrepreneurs end up starting their own business within the first 3 years after graduation, when the EU average is 4–8%.
 A study ("Effects and impact of entrepreneurship programmes in Higher Education") carried out by the European Commission (DG ENTR) on JE Europe Alumni, compared with normal students shows that:
 25% of JE Europe Alumni indicate that it is (very) likely for them to start their own business within the next ten years; compared to 16% of other students that have taken entrepreneurial education formal courses and to 10% of students who have not received any kind of entrepreneurship education; 
 78% of JE Europe Alumni find a job right after graduation; compared to 66% of other students that have taken entrepreneurial education courses and to 59% of students who have not received any kind of entrepreneurship education

Brasil Júnior - Brazilian Confederation of Junior Enterprises
Brasil Junior is the world's biggest junior enterprise confederation, composed by more than 1335 confederated junior enterprises and more than 22,000 junior entrepreneurs. It has as purpose to represent the junior enterprises nationwide and develop the Junior Enterprise Movement as an agent of business education and generation of new business. It is currently formed by 19 state federations.

Brasil Júnior works to bring together the state federations at meetings, and mainly, the junior enterprises at ENEJ (National Meeting of Junior Enterprises). In 2014, ENEJ happened at Espírito Santo with the attendance of 1,800 junior entrepreneurs.

Last year, from 13 to August 17 ENEJ happened at Brasilia, Brazil's capital. Around 2,500 junior entrepreneurs went to the event.

Rest of the world

Recently, junior enterprises appeared also in China, especially on the campus of Peking University. The movement is also taking its first step in North America with the recent launch a cross-faculty Junior Enterprise at McGill University in Canada. Shortly after the University of Illinois at Urbana-Champaign launched the first JE in the US.

See also
 French National Confederation of Junior Enterprises (CNJE)

References

External links
 JE Europe Official Site

Student organizations